The 614th Air Operations Center (614 AOC) was a space operations center of the United States Space Force's Space Operations Command. It served as the core of the Combined Space Operations Center, as well as serving as the Space Force's primary force provider to the CSpOC.

History 
Initially established on 1 August 1998, the 614th Space Operations Group conducted space operations as a part of Air Force Space Command's 14th Air Force. On 24 May 2007 it was redesignated as the 614th Air and Space Operations Center in alignment with the Component-Numbered Air Force structure. The 614th Space Intelligence Group, 614th Space Intelligence Squadron, and 614th Space Operations Squadron were all merged into the new Air and Space Operations Center. The 614th Air and Space Operations Center also served as the Air Force Space Command force provider to the Joint Space Operations Center. On 1 December 2014, the 614th Air and Space Operations Center was redesignated as the 614th Air Operations Center, continuing to serve as the primary Air Force Space Command provider to the Joint Space Operations Center. When the JSpOC was redesignated as the Combined Space Operations Center in 2018, the 614th AOC continued to support, later transitioning to the U.S. Space Force with the rest of Air Force Space Command on 20 December 2019.

On July 24th, 2020, the 614 AOC was inactivated and redesignated as Space Delta 5.

List of commanders 
Col Stephen N. Whiting, June 2006 – June 2008
Col Dick Boltz
Col Christopher Moss, 2010 – June 4, 2012
Col John Wagner, June 4, 2012 – June 6, 2014
Col John Giles, June 6, 2014 – 2016
Col Michael Manor, 2016 – June 15, 2018
Col Scott D. Brodeur, June 15, 2018 – July 24, 2020
Col Monique C. DeLauter, July 24, 2020 – July 24, 2020

References

Units and formations of the United States Space Force
Military units and formations in California
Military units and formations established in 1998
1998 establishments in California